John Bull is a national personification of the United Kingdom.

John Bull may also refer to:

People
John Bull (composer) (c. 1562–1628), English composer and musician
John Bull (prophet) (d. 1642), English self-proclaimed prophet
John Bull (Continental Congress) (c. 1740–1802), American statesman, Continental Congressman from South Carolina
John Bull (congressman) (1803–1863), US Congressman from Missouri
John Bull (priest) (fl. 1826–1830), Archdeacon of Barnstaple
John S. Bull (1934–2008), American pilot and astronaut
John Bull (gunman) (1836–1929), gunman of the American Old West
John Wrathall Bull (1804–1886), settler, inventor and colonial author of South Australia
John Bull (American Revolution)
John Bull (businessman) (1672–1742), businessman in the City of London

Other
John Bull (locomotive), an 1831 British-built railroad steam locomotive
John Bull (magazine), a series of British periodicals
John Bull (horse) (1789–1812), a British Thoroughbred racehorse and sire
John Bull (play), 1803 play by George Colman the Younger
John Bull Bitter, a product of Star Brewery
John Bull (1798 ship), a French prize captured in 1798
John Bull (1799 ship), a sailing ship built in 1799
John Bull (1800 ship), a French vessel that from 1800 became a British privateer
John Bull (1815 ship), built at Fort Gloster, Calcutta

See also
John Ball (disambiguation)
Jack Bull, the ring name of professional wrestler Gregg Groothuis
Jonny Bull, a member of the band Rialto
The Jack Bull, a 1999 Western film